Sewda Assembly constituency (formerly, Seondha) is one of the 230 Vidhan Sabha (Legislative Assembly) constituencies of Madhya Pradesh state in central India. This constituency came into existence in 1951, as one of the 48 Vidhan Sabha constituencies of the erstwhile Vindhya Pradesh state. It was reserved for the candidates belonging to the Scheduled castes till 2008.

Overview
Sewda (constituency number 20) is one of the 3 Vidhan Sabha constituencies located in Datia district. This constituency covers the entire Sewda tehsil of the district.

Sewda is part of Bhind Lok Sabha constituency along with seven other Vidhan Sabha segments, namely, Bhander and Datia in this district and Bhind, Ater, Lahar, Mehgaon and Gohad in Bhind district.

Members of Legislative Assembly
As a constituency of Vindhya Pradesh:
 1951: Ram Das, Indian National Congress / Laxmi Narayan Mahate (Diguwan), Indian National Congress
As a constituency of Madhya Pradesh:
 1977: Tulsi Ram, Janata Party
 1980: Mangal Singh, Indian National Congress (I)
 1985: Mahendra Boudh, Indian National Congress
 1990: Mahendra Boudh, Indian National Congress
 1993: Ram Dayal Prabhakar, Bharatiya Janata Party
 1998: Mahendra Boudh, Indian National Congress
 2003: Ram Dayal Prabhakar, Bharatiya Janata Party
 2008: Radhelal Baghel, Bahujan Samaj Party
 2013: Pradeep Agrawal, Bharatiya Janata Party
 2018 : Kunwar Ghansyam Singh, Indian National Congress

See also
 Seondha
 Ratangarh, Datia
 Datia district

References

Datia district
Assembly constituencies of Madhya Pradesh